Hileithia approprialis is a moth in the family Crambidae. It was described by Harrison Gray Dyar Jr. in 1914. It is found in Panama.

The wingspan is 13–14 mm. The wings are pale straw yellow with dense costal dots on the forewings. The ground colour is shaded with brown along the margins of both wings.

References

Moths described in 1914
Spilomelinae